The Phoenix Public Library is a municipal library system serving Phoenix, Arizona, and operated by the city of Phoenix. There are 16 branches currently in operation citywide, anchored by the flagship Burton Barr Central Library on the northern edge of downtown Phoenix. Four of the 16 locations were designed by prominent local architect Will Bruder: the Burton Barr central library (opened May 1995), the Cholla branch location at Metrocenter Mall (opened 1977, enlarged and remodeled in 1990), the Mesquite branch at Paradise Valley Mall (opened November 1982, expanded May 1998), and the Agave branch in far northwest Phoenix (opened June 2009). Many of its branches are named for endemic desert plants.

Background
The library traces its origins to 1897 when a group of citizens decided to raise funds for a library. This group, the Friday Club, consisting of women of upper socioeconomic standing with the same interests of advancement, sought to establish and organize the first public library in Phoenix. By opening day, the library consisted of 1,500 titles. In 1904, industrialist Andrew Carnegie donated money for a library building on Washington Street near the state capital; this building is still in operation as a museum, archives and research center operated by the state of Arizona.

With the explosive growth of Phoenix after World War II, new branches were added citywide. A Central Library was opened in 1953 (replacing the Carnegie Library as Phoenix's main library location), but replaced by the aforementioned Burton Barr Central Library in 1995 (its building is now part of the Phoenix Art Museum).

Libraries 
The library is in Phoenix's City Council District 7. Burton Barr Central Library
It replaced the earlier Desert Mission Library which opened in 1929, and was housed in a  building on 330 E. Eva Street. Acacia library is in District 3. Acacia Library
The library is in District 1. Agave Library
The library is in District 6. Century Library
Like the Central Library, Cesar Chavez is located in District 7. Cesar Chavez Library
 The Cholla Library opened in 1977 and was expanded and remodeled in 1990. The library is located near Metrocenter Mall in District 1, like Agave. Cholla Library
 The Desert Broom Library opened in February 2005 and has won numerous awards for its design, including the 2006 ALA/IIDA Award for Innovation in Sustainable Design. Desert Broom Library
Like Central and Cesar Chavez, Desert Sage is in District 7. Desert Sage Library
Harmon is in District 8. Harmon Library
Ironwood is in District 6, like Century Library. Ironwood Library
 The Juniper Library, opened in July 1996. Juniper is in District 3. Juniper Library
 The Mesquite Library, opened in November 1982 and was expanded in May 1998. Mesquite is near the Paradise Valley Mall in District 3, like Juniper. Mesquite Library
 The Ocotillo Library opened in 1967 and was remodeled in 2012. Ocotillo Library
 The Palo Verde Library opened in January 2006 in Maryvale Village. Palo Verde Library
 The Saguaro Library opened in September 1964. Saguaro Library
 South Mountain Community Library opened in September 2011 as a partnership between Phoenix and South Mountain Community College (SMCC). South Mountain Community Library
 The Yucca Library opened in March 1969 and was remodeled in 2001.  in size, Yucca is located in District 5, like Palo Verde. Yucca Library

Notes

External links 

 Phoenix Public Library Official Web Site

Buildings and structures in Phoenix, Arizona
Public libraries in Arizona
Carnegie libraries in Arizona
Tourist attractions in Phoenix, Arizona